Bears or Beers is a small village in the Dutch province of Friesland. It is located in the municipality Leeuwarden, about 8 km southwest of Leeuwarden. Bears has a population of about 133 in January 2017.

The official name of the village is in Frisian ("Bears"), like all villages in Littenseradiel. "Beers" is the Dutch name.

History
It was first mentioned in 1305 as Beerse, and means "fenced off hunting area". Bears is a terp (artificial living hill) village. The Protestant church of Bears dates from the 13th century. The Uniastate was a stins of the Unia family. The estate was demolished in 1756, and only the gate house has remained. A steel framed replica of the estate was built in the 1990, and has an observation tower in the middle to view the landscape.

Before 2018, the village was part of the Littenseradiel municipality.

Notable buildings
 The Protestant church of Bears

Gallery

References

External links

Leeuwarden
Populated places in Friesland